"Love Light in Flight" is a song written, produced, and performed by American R&B singer-songwriter Stevie Wonder. It was released in 1984, from The Woman in Red soundtrack. It peaked at number 4 on Billboard Black Singles, number 1 on the RPM Adult Contemporary chart, and number 17 on the Billboard Hot 100 for February 2, 1985.

Cash Box called it a return to "sultry funk" that "is certain to delight those Stevie fans (few though they might be) who found 'I Just Called To Say I Love You' a trifle bland compared to vintage Wonder."  Billboard similarly said that "old fans may find this one even more enticing than 'I Just Called...'"

Personnel
Stevie Wonder - synthesizer, drums, vocals
Lenny Castro - congas
Antoinette Wood, Finis Henderson, III, Gene VanBuren, Judy Cheeks, Lynn Davis, Portia Griffin, Susaye Greene, Windy Barnes - backing vocals

Charts

References

Stevie Wonder songs
1984 songs
1984 singles
Songs written by Stevie Wonder
Songs written for films
Motown singles
Smooth jazz songs
Song recordings produced by Stevie Wonder